Laura Cumming is the art critic of The Observer newspaper, a position she has held since 1999. Before that she worked for The Guardian, the New Statesman and the BBC. In addition to her career in journalism, Cumming has written well-received books on self-portraits in art and the discovery of a lost portrait by Diego Velázquez in 1845. The Vanishing Man was a New York Times bestseller and won the James Tait Black Memorial Prize in 2017.

Early life
Cumming is the daughter of the Scottish artists James Cumming and Betty Elston, his wife. A memoir based on her mother's disappearance as a child, On Chapel Sands: My mother and Other Missing Persons, was published in July 2019 by Chatto. It was shortlisted for the 2019 Baillie Gifford Prize.

Career
Cumming was literary editor of the BBC's The Listener, assistant editor of the New Statesman, and the presenter of Nightwaves on BBC Radio 3.
 
Cumming has written two books on art. Her work on self-portraits, A Face to the World: On Self-Portraits (2009), was praised by Serena Davies in The Daily Telegraph for seeking to "persuade us, with sumptuous superlatives, how great her subjects are" rather than baffling the reader with art theory as some other works do. Her work on the discovery of a lost Diego Velázquez portrait by John Snare in 1845, The Vanishing Man: In Pursuit of Velázquez (2016), was described by Honor Clerk in The Spectator as "a study in obsession, a paean of praise to an artist of genius, a detective story and, for the author, an exorcism of grief". Fisun Güner, in The Independent praised the "beautifully compelling accounts of Velázquez's paintings" that revealed as much about Cumming's own relationship with the work of Velázquez as it did about the ostensible subject of the book. Jonathan Beckman in The Times, however, felt that the book was "breathless" and that its source materials (or lack thereof) didn't completely support the weight that Cumming placed on them. The book was serialised on BBC Radio 4 in a reading by Siobhan Redmond.

Cumming's book On Chapel Sands: My Mother and Other Missing Persons, published in 2019, was shortlisted for the Costa Book award in the Biography and Memoir category, 2019.

Selected publications
Julian Barnes. Book Trust in association with the British Council, London, 1990.
A Face to the World: On Self-Portraits. HarperPress, London, 2009. 
The Vanishing Man: In Pursuit of Velazquez. Chatto & Windus, London, 2016, ; published in the United States as The Vanishing Velázquez: A 19th-century Bookseller's Obsession with a Lost Masterpiece Scribner, New York, 2016, .
On Chapel Sands: My Mother and Other Missing Persons. Chatto & Windus, London, 2019,

References 

Living people
British art critics
British journalists
British non-fiction writers
Year of birth missing (living people)